Linda Ann Myers (born June 19, 1947) is a former World Champion archer who represented the United States.

Myers was born in York, Pennsylvania, and was selected to represent the United States at the 1972 and 1976 Olympics, where she finished 5th and 7th respectively. She became the World Champion at the 1973 World Archery Championships in Grenoble, also achieving a team silver medal.

References

1947 births
Living people
American female archers
Olympic archers of the United States
Archers at the 1972 Summer Olympics
Archers at the 1976 Summer Olympics
World Archery Championships medalists
21st-century American women